Tangaki Taulupe "Toby" Faletau (born 12 November 1990) is a Welsh professional rugby union player for Cardiff Rugby in the United Rugby Championship and has represented the  national team for over 10 years.  The back row forward played for Cross Keys RFC, Newport RFC and Newport Gwent Dragons in Wales before joining Bath in England in 2016.  He joined present club Cardiff in 2022.

Early life
Faletau was born in Tofoa, Tonga, to Tongan international Kuli Faletau, who represented Tonga at the 1999 Rugby World Cup; he started his career at prop but was later moved to number 8. Kuli moved to Wales in 1997 to join Ebbw Vale. Taulupe attended Pontygof Primary School until 1999 and then Pontnewynydd Primary School until July 2002, then attended Trevethin Community School, then attended Filton College (now part of South Gloucestershire and Stroud College) as part of the college's successful rugby academy and was recognised as 'player of the year' during his time at the college.

As a young boy, his school friends struggled to pronounce his Tongan name, and so he picked up the nickname Toby. In recent years, he has requested that his rugby squad name be recorded more accurately as Taulupe, but does not mind being called Toby.

Early career
Faletau spent his early years in Wales playing for Ebbw Vale RFC and New Panteg RFC juniors alongside Mako and Billy Vunipola until youth level, when he moved to Filton College, Bristol, to experience the English game. Prior to his move across the border, he had suffered several setbacks from both the Gwent District organisation and the Newport Gwent Dragons Regional.

Faletau made his debut for the Newport Gwent Dragons senior team, on 1 November 2009, versus Edinburgh.

On 22 December 2009, he was named in the Wales under-20 Squad for the 2010 Under-20 Six Nations tournament. In May 2010, he was selected for the Wales Under 20 Squad for the Junior World Cup in Argentina in June 2010.

Club career
Faletau played a significant role in Newport Gwent Dragons's run to the semi-finals of the 2014–15 European Rugby Challenge Cup, playing in seven of their eight games during the competition until they were eventually knocked out by Edinburgh.

It was confirmed on 9 December 2015 that, after months of speculation, Faletau would be joining English Premiership side Bath Rugby in time for the 2016–17 season.

On 5 November 2021, it was confirmed that Faletau would return to Wales to join Cardiff in the United Rugby Championship ahead of the 2022-23 season.

International career
He was first called up to the Wales senior squad on 1 November 2010 following the withdrawal of Ryan Jones and Rob McCusker. In January 2011, he was included in the Wales squad for the 2011 Six Nations Championship. He made his full international debut for Wales versus the Barbarians on 4 June 2011.

In August 2011, he was named in the Wales squad for the 2011 Rugby World Cup in New Zealand. On 11 September 2011, he made his World Cup debut for Wales against South Africa, scoring his first international try in the second half, adding another in the game against Namibia. He finished the tournament as the top tackler and ball carrier, the first time a single player has ever topped both tables. He was the only player to start all seven of Wales' games.

He then appeared in all five matches of Wales' Grand Slam-winning 2012 Six Nations Championship campaign, excelling throughout the championship and making many pundits' team of the tournament.

In May 2012, Faletau was announced in the Wales squad for the three test series against Australia, but he had to withdraw from the squad after suffering a broken hand in the first test in Brisbane.

Faletau also played all five games in Wales' 2013 Six Nations Championship victory, including the 30–3 win over England in the final match.

In April 2013, Faletau was named in the squad for the 2013 British & Irish Lions tour to Australia. After failing to feature in the first two tests, Faletau was named at number 8 in the final test ahead of Jamie Heaslip. The Welshman was impressive, as the Lions beat Australia 41–16 securing their first test series win since 1997. During the same summer, it was announced that Faletau had signed a new three-year deal to remain at the Dragons region until 2016.

Faletau continued to represent Wales in the November 2013 Autumn Series, scoring his third test try against Argentina in a man of the match performance.

On 20 January 2014, Faletau was included in the 32-man Wales squad for the 2014 Six Nations Championship. He started all five games and scored a try in a 51–3 thrashing of Scotland on 15 March, as Wales finished the campaign in 3rd.

On 30 May 2014, Faletau was named in the 32-man squad for the mid-year test series against South Africa after playing in a "Possibles vs Probables" match at the Liberty Stadium, in which he played on the Probables team, which won 55–7. He started both tests on the tour including the narrow 31–30-second test defeat, in which Wales lost after conceding a last minute penalty try.

On 21 October 2014, Faletau was included in the Wales squad for the 2014 Autumn Series, starting all 4 games including a historic victory over South Africa in the final test on 29 November.

Faletau played every minute of Wales' 2015 Six Nations campaign, which included the Round 4 23–16 victory against Ireland in which Wales made a massive 250 tackles to deny the Irish a grand slam, and the final round 61–20 thrashing of Italy, which left Ireland needing to win their game against Scotland by 17 points or more to clinch the championship, which they did.

Before the game against Italy in the 2015 Six Nations campaign, an email from the Welsh Rugby Union indicated that Faletau wanted to be known by his birth name of Taulupe Faletau. Faletau was selected for the 2015 Rugby World Cup later that year as part of Wales' 31-man squad. Faletau started in the quarter-final against South Africa on 17 October 2015 and was not subbed off, but Wales unluckily lost to South Africa 19–23, being knocked out of the competition.

Faletau and his childhood friends, Mako and Billy Vunipola,  were selected for the British & Irish Lions for their 2017 tour to New Zealand. However, Billy withdrew from the touring squad due to injury, leaving Faletau, as well as his brother to head off on their second Lions tour without him. Vunipola's injury went on to benefit Faletau, as he started the first match on tour, winning Man of the Match against the New Zealand Barbarians on 3 June 2017. Faletau went on to start in wins against the Crusaders and the Māori All Blacks, playing the full 80 minutes in both. Standout performances across the tour allowed Faletau a starting place in all three tests against the All Blacks. On 1 July 2017, Faletau scored the opening try of the second test against the All Blacks in the 59th minute, barging over All Blacks back Israel Dagg to score. Faletau's try inspired a late comeback from the Lions, with both teams down to 14 players, and the Lions went on to make a historic win over the All Blacks that day, beating them 24–21. Faletau finished the 1-1 drawn series without being subbed off for the whole Lions tour and played the most minutes of anyone on tour.

On 11 March 2018, in Wales' match against Italy, in the fifth round of the 2018 Six Nations Championship, Faletau was appointed as captain of the Welsh team for the first time in his career, becoming the 131st player to become captain of Wales' international rugby team. This marked a return from injury for Faletau, who played the full 80 minutes as Wales beat Italy 38–14.

International tries

Wales

British & Irish Lions

References

External links

Newport Gwent Dragons profile
Wales profile

1990 births
Living people
People from Tongatapu
Bath Rugby players
Welsh rugby union players
Wales international rugby union players
Tongan rugby union players
Tongan emigrants to Wales
Welsh people of Tongan descent
Dragons RFC players
British & Irish Lions rugby union players from Wales
Rugby union flankers
Rugby union number eights
British & Irish Lions rugby union players from Tonga
Cardiff Rugby players
Rugby union players from Pontypool